Cindy Hyde-Smith (née Hyde; born May 10, 1959) is an American politician serving as the junior United States senator from Mississippi since 2018. A member of the Republican Party, she was previously the Mississippi Commissioner of Agriculture and Commerce and a member of the Mississippi State Senate.

Born in Brookhaven, Mississippi, Hyde-Smith is a graduate of Copiah–Lincoln Community College and the University of Southern Mississippi. In 1999, she was elected to the Mississippi State Senate as a Democrat. She represented the 39th district from 2000 to 2012. In 2010, Hyde-Smith switched parties and became a Republican, citing her conservative beliefs. Hyde-Smith was elected Mississippi agriculture commissioner in 2011, the first woman elected to that office.

On March 21, 2018, Governor Phil Bryant announced his intention to appoint Hyde-Smith to the United States Senate seat being vacated due to the resignation of Thad Cochran. Hyde-Smith was sworn into office on April 9, 2018. She is the first woman to represent Mississippi in Congress. Hyde-Smith was a candidate in the 2018 U.S. Senate special election for the remainder of Cochran's term, which expired in 2021. She finished first in the top-two general election on November 6, 2018, but did not receive more than 50% of the vote, thus advancing to a November 27 special runoff election versus Mike Espy. Hyde-Smith won the runoff election, becoming the first woman elected to Congress from Mississippi.

In January 2021, Hyde-Smith joined a group of Republican senators who objected to certifying some swing states' electoral votes as part of an attempt to overturn the 2020 United States presidential election.

Early life
Hyde-Smith was born in Brookhaven, Mississippi, the daughter of Lorraine Hyde and Luther Hyde, and grew up in Monticello, Mississippi. She attended Lawrence County Academy in Monticello, a segregation academy established in response to Supreme Court rulings ordering the desegregation of public schools. The school's team nickname was the Rebels; the mascot was a "Col. Reb" who carried a Confederate flag.

Hyde-Smith graduated from Copiah–Lincoln Community College with an Associate of Arts (AA) and the University of Southern Mississippi with a Bachelor of Arts (BA) in criminal justice and political science. She is one of the few U.S. senators who attended community college. After her studies, she worked as a lobbyist for the Southern Coalition for Safer Highways and National Coalition for Healthcare, with offices in Washington, D.C. and San Francisco. She served as the state director for Mississippi, Louisiana, and Tennessee during her time with the National Coalition for Healthcare, which advocated nationwide healthcare coverage.

Mississippi Senate
Hyde-Smith was a member of the Mississippi Senate, representing the 39th District from 2000 to 2012. For part of her tenure, she chaired the Senate Agriculture Committee, which led her Senate colleagues to encourage her to run for Mississippi Commissioner of Agriculture and Commerce. She had a conservative voting record in the state Senate. During her time in the state Senate, 79 of her bills became law. She supported measures to collect DNA samples from people in custody of the Department of Corrections and authored a bill to ban most abortions after 12 weeks. After the abortion restriction bill passed and was signed by then-Governor Haley Barbour, it was overturned in federal court. On the Senate Agriculture Committee, Hyde-Smith also helped manage the fallout from a controversial beef plant that defaulted on a $55 million state loan. The state sued firms involved in the construction of a 400-employee plant in Yalobusha County that closed three months after it opened, in August 2004. The state eventually settled with the plant owners for $4 million. In 2001, Hyde-Smith introduced legislation to name a portion of Highway 51 for Jefferson Davis, the president of the Confederacy, who had no ties to the area. The bill died in committee. Hyde-Smith also voted for resolutions honoring civil rights leader Medgar Evers, the Freedom Riders and Hiram Rhodes Revels, who, through legislative appointment during Reconstruction, became the first African American to represent Mississippi in the U.S. Senate. In 2009, Hyde-Smith led an effort to override Barbour's veto of a bill that sought to restrict the power of eminent domain to public use, thereby prohibiting eminent domain for private economic purposes. The bill passed the state House 119-3 and the state Senate unanimously. Barbour vetoed the bill on the grounds that the restriction could harm the state's business climate. The legislature attempted to override his veto, but was unsuccessful. In the House, the override vote was successful with a 101-19 vote, but it failed in the Senate, 28-22. Hyde-Smith was critical of senators who switched their vote after the veto, saying, "Not only could you never come to this podium again and say 'I protect private property rights', you're still gonna have to say 'I changed my vote to vote against private property rights'."

On December 28, 2010, Hyde-Smith announced that she had switched her party affiliation from Democratic to Republican. Her switch made the Senate equally divided between Republicans and Democrats, with each party holding 26 seats. In 2011, Senator Ezell Lee also switched his party affiliation from Democratic to Republican, which gave Republicans a 27-25 majority heading into the 2011 elections. This marked the first time since the Reconstruction era in which Republicans held a majority of seats in the chamber.

Elections

Hyde-Smith first sought election to the Mississippi Senate in 1999, as she concluded her career as a lobbyist and transitioned back to the state. She returned to Mississippi, gave birth to her daughter, and qualified to run for state Senate all in one year. Her opponent in the 1999 Mississippi Senate Democratic primary was 20-year incumbent W. L. Rayborn. She perceived that Rayborn prioritized his personal interests over his district's and had supported his opponents in the previous two elections. During the campaign, Hyde-Smith refused to criticize him or target specific issues. Rayborn was known for a pet cause—allowing non-dentists to make false teeth. A denturist without a dental degree, he showed up to the Capitol a few days each session adorned with buttons and stickers promoting his bill "The Freedom of Choice Dentures Act." In 1999, his last year in office, it died in committee. Hyde-Smith defeated Rayborn in the Democratic primary and Republican Helen Price and independent Frank Greer in the general election, with 75.36% of the vote.

In the 2003 Democratic primary, Rayborn challenged Hyde-Smith in the newly redrawn state Senate District 39 and lost, 65.47% to 34.53%. Hyde-Smith was unopposed in the general election.

In 2007, Hyde-Smith was unopposed in the Senate District 39 Democratic primary. In the general election, she defeated Republican Edwin V. Case with 79.45% of the vote. This was her last election in the Senate district.

Mississippi Commissioner of Agriculture and Commerce

Hyde-Smith was elected Mississippi Commissioner of Agriculture and Commerce in 2011 and took office on January 5, 2012. She was reelected in 2015, defeating Democratic nominee Addie Lee Green.

U.S. Senate

Appointment
On March 21, 2018, Governor Phil Bryant announced Hyde-Smith as his choice to fill the United States Senate seat held by Thad Cochran, who indicated he would resign the seat due to health issues. Cochran resigned on April 1, and Bryant formally appointed Hyde-Smith on April 2. Hyde-Smith became the first woman to represent Mississippi in the United States Congress. The Senate was in a district work period and was not conducting legislative business at that time, so she did not take the oath of office until the Senate reconvened for legislative business on April 9. Hyde-Smith announced that she would seek election to the seat in the 2018 special election on November 6.

Elections

2018 special election 

The Trump administration reportedly did not support Hyde-Smith's Senate appointment because of her history as a Democrat, but in August 2018, Trump endorsed her for election. He stumped for Hyde-Smith in suburban northern Mississippi.

In the 2018 special election, Hyde-Smith was challenged by Republican Chris McDaniel, who criticized her past Democratic affiliation. Hyde-Smith responded that she had "always been a conservative" and added that she had the support of Republican Mississippi Governor Phil Bryant. She highlighted her support for Second Amendment rights, opposition to abortion, and advocacy for the state's defense business.

Hyde-Smith declined to debate her Democratic opponent, Mike Espy, before the November 6 special election; Cochran had often done the same. After she and Espy each finished with about 41% of the vote, she agreed to debate Espy on November 20 before the runoff election.

During the runoff campaign, while appearing with cattle rancher Colin Hutchinson in Tupelo, Mississippi, Hyde-Smith said, "If he invited me to a public hanging, I'd be in the front row." The remark immediately drew harsh criticism, given Mississippi's notorious history of lynchings and public executions of African-Americans. In response to the criticism, Hyde-Smith downplayed her comment as "an exaggerated expression of regard" and called the backlash "ridiculous." She refused to apologize.

On November 12, 2018, Hyde-Smith joined Mississippi Governor Phil Bryant at a news conference in Jackson, Mississippi, where she was asked repeatedly about her comment by reporters. She repeatedly responded, "I put out a statement yesterday, and that's all I'm gonna say about it." When reporters redirected questions to Bryant, he defended Hyde-Smith's comment and changed the subject to abortion, saying he was "confused about where the outrage is at about 20 million African American children that have been aborted."

On November 15, 2018, Hyde-Smith appeared in a video clip saying that it would be "a great idea" to make it more difficult for liberals to vote. Her campaign said Hyde-Smith was obviously joking and that the video was selectively edited. Both this and the "public hanging" video were released by Lamar White Jr., a Louisiana blogger and journalist.

Also in November 2018, media reports noted that Hyde-Smith attended a school that was created to avoid court-mandated racial integration and made use of various confederate symbols, and that she sent her daughter to a similar school.

The runoff election was held on November 27. Hyde-Smith defeated Espy, 53.9%-46.1%.

Tenure 
On October 16, 2018, Hyde-Smith voted to confirm Brett Kavanaugh to the Supreme Court of the United States.

On October 26, 2020, Hyde-Smith voted to confirm Amy Coney Barrett to the Supreme Court of the United States.

On January 6, 2021, Hyde-Smith was participating in the 2021 United States Electoral College vote count debate about Arizona's electoral votes when Trump supporters stormed the United States Capitol. She and other senators were removed from the Senate floor to an undisclosed location shortly after the Capitol was breached. Her staff had to shelter in her office. During the attack, Hyde-Smith tweeted: "Whatever frustrations any American may have, violence & destruction in the US Capitol, the seat of our democratic government, is unacceptable". She later said that she was afraid during the storming of the Capitol and called the rioters "criminals who need to be prosecuted".

Committee assignments 
 Committee on Agriculture, Nutrition and Forestry
 Committee on Appropriations
 Subcommittee on Agriculture, Rural Development, Food and Drug Administration, and Related Agencies
 Subcommittee on the Interior, Environment, and Related Agencies
 Subcommittee on Labor, Health and Human Services, Education, and Related Agencies
 Subcommittee on the Legislative Branch
 Subcommittee on State, Foreign Operations, and Related Programs
 Committee on Energy and Natural Resources
 Committee on Rules and Administration

Political positions
Hyde-Smith identifies herself as a conservative Republican. From 1999 to 2010, she served in elected office as a Democrat. She voted in the Democratic primary in 2008 and described herself as having been a conservative Democrat during her tenure in the state legislature. She switched to the Republican Party in 2010.

In 2012, Hyde-Smith endorsed Republican nominee Mitt Romney for U.S. President.

FiveThirtyEight reported that as of January 2021, Hyde-Smith had voted in line with Donald Trump's political positions about 92% of the time. It also reported that as of November 2022, she had voted in line with President Joe Biden's political positions about 38.9% of the time.

2021 United States Electoral College vote count 
On January 6, 2021, Hyde-Smith joined four other senators in voting to object to the certification of Arizona's electoral votes. She said she based her decision on "the erosion of integrity of the electoral process." Hyde-Smith added that her constituents "do not believe the presidential election was constitutional and cannot accept the Electoral College decision." Her position differed from that of fellow Mississippi senator Roger Wicker, who supported certification. She also voted not to certify Pennsylvania's electoral votes. The Jackson Free Press called on Hyde-Smith to "recant or resign" for objecting to the certification of Arizona's and Pennsylvania's electoral votes.

Following the attack on the Capitol, Hyde-Smith did not support invoking the Twenty-fifth Amendment to the United States Constitution to remove Trump from office. She also said she would not vote to convict Trump in the event of an impeachment trial.

On May 28, 2021, Hyde-Smith voted against creating an independent commission to investigate the 2021 United States Capitol attack.

Voting rights 
In 2021, Hyde-Smith expressed opposition to the For the People Act, which would expand voting rights, falsely claiming that the bill would nullify voter identification laws in Mississippi. She also objected to allowing people to vote on Sunday, which is the Christian Sabbath and a day that black churches coordinate rides to polling places for their parishioners.

Fiscal policy 
Hyde-Smith describes her economic positions as fiscally conservative.

In 2018, Hyde-Smith was one of 29 Republicans who joined all Democrats in opposing Senator Rand Paul's bill to cut federal spending by 1% over 5 years, known as the Penny Bill. Republican opponents of the bill said it could threaten federal defense and domestic programs. She faced criticism from the bill's supporters.

Hyde-Smith supported the Trump-backed Tax Cuts and Jobs Act of 2017. As a state legislator, she voted in favor of increasing unemployment benefits and in favor of raising taxes on cigarettes. She also voted with all Mississippi Democrats in the state legislature to restore funding that had been previously eliminated due to budget cuts.

In May 2019, Hyde-Smith was a cosponsor of the Transporting Livestock Across America Safely Act, a bipartisan bill introduced by Ben Sasse and Jon Tester intended to reform hours of service for livestock haulers by authorizing drivers to rest at any point during their trip without it being counted against their hours of service and exempting loading and unloading times from the hours of service calculation of driving time.

In July 2019, Hyde-Smith was one of eight senators to introduce the Agricultural Trucking Relief Act, a bill that would alter the definition of an agricultural commodity to include both horticultural and aquacultural products and promote greater consistency in regulation through both federal and state agencies as part of an attempt to ease regulatory burdens on trucking and the agri-community.

Foreign policy
In August 2018, Hyde-Smith co-sponsored the Israel Anti-Boycott Act (s. 720), which would make it a federal crime for Americans to encourage or participate in boycotts against Israel and Israeli settlements in the occupied West Bank if protesting actions by the Israeli government.

Health care
Hyde-Smith opposes the Affordable Care Act (Obamacare), saying that it "has failed Mississippi." She is in favor of repealing it but says that she supports keeping provisions ensuring protections for preexisting conditions. While in the Senate, she voted to expand the use of short-term health insurance plans, which can discriminate against people with preexisting conditions.

In July 2019, Hyde-Smith was one of eight senators to cosponsor the Palliative Care and Hospice Education and Training Act (PCHETA), a bill intended to strengthen training for new and existing physicians, people who teach palliative care, and other providers who are on the palliative care team that grants patients and their families a voice in their care and treatment goals.

In October 2019, Hyde-Smith was one of 27 senators to sign a letter to Senate Majority Leader Mitch McConnell and Senate Minority Leader Chuck Schumer advocating the passage of the Community Health Investment, Modernization, and Excellence (CHIME) Act, which was set to expire the following month. The senators warned that if the funding for the Community Health Center Fund (CHCF) was allowed to expire, it "would cause an estimated 2,400 site closures, 47,000 lost jobs, and threaten the health care of approximately 9 million Americans."

Supreme Court 

In March 2019 Hyde-Smith was one of 12 senators to co-sponsor a resolution in favor of a constitutional amendment limiting the Supreme Court to nine justices. The resolution was introduced after multiple Democratic presidential candidates expressed openness to expanding the number of seats on the Supreme Court.

Social issues
Hyde-Smith's 2018 campaign described her as having a "strong social conservative voting record with a 100 percent pro-life rating [who is] a lifetime member of the NRA." Gun Owners of America, which supports gun owners' rights and is in favor of loosening restrictions on guns, gave her a rating of 50% in 2018.

Hyde-Smith opposes abortion. As a state senator, she authored a bill requiring that all abortions after 12 weeks of pregnancy be performed in a hospital or ambulatory surgical facility; the bill was blocked by federal courts. In 2018, she voted with Senate Republicans to prohibit federal funding from being given to any organization or facility that promotes abortion services or family planning. She opposes Planned Parenthood, describing it as "one of the worst things that has ever happened to us."

In 2018 Hyde-Smith released a statement supporting the Trump administration's travel ban on seven predominantly Muslim countries. Her campaign website says she supports the construction of a wall along the southern US border.

In 2012, as the Commissioner of Agriculture and Commerce, Hyde-Smith was personally opposed to a same-sex commitment ceremony at the Mississippi Agriculture & Forestry Museum, but instructed the museum to allow it after consulting with Mississippi Attorney General Jim Hood. She declared she would seek a change in state law and request from the legislature "clear and straightforward definitions about what activities can take place on the property owned by the State of Mississippi." In November 2022, she voted against the Respect for Marriage Act, legislation that codifies same-sex marriage rights into federal law.

Confederate States of America 
In 2007, Hyde-Smith voted for a resolution that praised a Confederate States Army soldier for his efforts to "defend his homeland". During her first term in the Mississippi Senate, she proposed renaming a state highway after Confederate President Jefferson Davis, but the legislation did not pass. In 2014, Hyde-Smith posted a photo of herself at Davis's home, Beauvoir, wearing a Confederate cap and carrying a rifle, with the caption "Mississippi history at its best!"

Donald Trump
On February 5, 2020, at the first impeachment trial of President Donald Trump, Hyde-Smith voted to acquit Trump. He was acquitted.

On February 13, 2021, at Trump's second impeachment trial, Hyde-Smith voted to acquit Trump. He was acquitted.

Personal life
Hyde-Smith is married to a cattle farmer, Mike Smith. They are members of the Macedonia Baptist Church. They have a daughter who graduated in 2017 from Brookhaven Academy.

Electoral history

Mississippi State Senate

Mississippi Commissioner of Agriculture and Commerce

U.S. Senate

2018

2020

See also
List of American politicians who switched parties in office
List of party switchers in the United States
Women in the United States Senate

References

External links

U.S. Senator Cindy Hyde-Smith official U.S. Senate website
Cindy Hyde-Smith for U.S. Senate

MDAC Commissioner Biography archived official government website
Financial data from OpenSecrets

|-

|-

|-

|-

|-

1959 births
20th-century American women politicians
20th-century American politicians
21st-century American women politicians
21st-century American politicians
Baptists from Mississippi
Baptists from the United States
Farmers from Mississippi
Democratic Party Mississippi state senators
Female United States senators
Living people
Mississippi Commissioners of Agriculture and Commerce
People from Brookhaven, Mississippi
Republican Party Mississippi state senators
Republican Party United States senators from Mississippi
University of Southern Mississippi alumni
Women state legislators in Mississippi